Alexander I (medieval Gaelic: Alaxandair mac Maíl Coluim; modern Gaelic: Alasdair mac Mhaol Chaluim; c. 1078 – 23 April 1124), posthumously nicknamed The Fierce, was the King of Scotland from 1107 to his death. He succeeded his brother, King Edgar, and his successor was his brother David. He was married to Sybilla of Normandy, an illegitimate daughter of Henry I of England.

Life
Alexander was the fifth (some sources say fourth) son of Malcolm III and his wife Margaret of Wessex, grandniece of Edward the Confessor. Alexander was named after Pope Alexander II.

He was the younger brother of King Edgar, who was unmarried, and his brother's heir presumptive by 1104 (and perhaps earlier). In that year, he was the senior layman present at the examination of the remains of Saint Cuthbert at Durham prior to their re-interment. He held lands in Scotland north of the Forth and in Lothian.

On the death of Edgar in 1107, Alexander succeeded to the Scottish crown but, in accordance with Edgar's instructions, their brother David was granted an appanage in southern Scotland. Edgar's will granted David the lands of the former kingdom of Strathclyde or Cumbria, and this was apparently agreed in advance by Edgar, Alexander, David and their brother-in-law Henry I of England. In 1113, perhaps at Henry's instigation, and with the support of his Anglo-Norman allies, David demanded and received, additional lands in Lothian along the Upper Tweed and Teviot. David did not receive the title of king, but of "prince of the Cumbrians", and his lands remained under Alexander's final authority.

The dispute over Tweeddale and Teviotdale does not appear to have damaged relations between Alexander and David, although it was unpopular in some quarters. A Gaelic poem laments:It's bad what Malcolm's son has done,dividing us from Alexander;he causes, like each king's son before,the plunder of stable Alba.

The dispute over the eastern marches does not appear to have caused lasting trouble between Alexander and Henry of England. In 1114, he joined Henry on campaign in Wales against Gruffudd ap Cynan of Gwynedd. Alexander's marriage with Henry's illegitimate daughter Sybilla of Normandy may have occurred as early as 1107, or as at late as 1114.

William of Malmesbury's account attacks Sybilla, but the evidence argues that Alexander and Sybilla were a devoted but childless couple and Sybilla was of noteworthy piety. Sybilla died in unrecorded circumstances at Eilean nam Ban (Kenmore on Loch Tay) in July 1122 and was buried at Dunfermline Abbey. Alexander did not remarry and Walter Bower wrote that he planned an Augustinian Priory at the Eilean nam Ban dedicated to Sybilla's memory, and he may have taken steps to have her venerated.

Alexander had at least one illegitimate child, Máel Coluim mac Alaxandair, who was later involved in a revolt against David I in the 1130s. He was imprisoned at Roxburgh for many years afterwards, perhaps until his death some time after 1157.

Alexander was, like his brothers Edgar and David, a notably pious king. He was responsible for foundations at Scone and Inchcolm, the latter founded in thanks for his survival of a tempest at sea nearby. He had the two towers built which flanked the great western entrance of Dunfermline Abbey, where his mother was buried.

His mother's chaplain and hagiographer Thurgot was named Bishop of Saint Andrews (or Cell Rígmonaid) in 1107, presumably by Alexander's order.  The case of Thurgot's would-be successor Eadmer shows that Alexander's wishes were not always accepted by the religious community, perhaps because Eadmer had the backing of the Archbishop of Canterbury, Ralph d'Escures, rather than Thurstan of York.  Alexander also patronised Saint Andrews, granting lands intended for an Augustinian Priory, which may have been the same as that intended to honour his wife.

For all his religiosity, Alexander was not remembered as a man of peace. John of Fordun says of him:

He manifested the terrible aspect of his character in his reprisals in the Province of Moray. Andrew of Wyntoun's Orygynale Cronykil of Scotland says that Alexander was holding court at Invergowrie when he was attacked by "men of the Isles". Walter Bower says the attackers were from Moray and Mearns. Alexander pursued them north, to "Stockford" in Ross (near Beauly) where he defeated them. This, says Wyntoun, is why he was named the "Fierce". The dating of this is uncertain, as are his enemies' identities. However, in 1116 the Annals of Ulster report: "Ladhmann son of Domnall, grandson of the king of Scotland, was killed by the men of Moray." The king referred to is Alexander's father, Malcolm III, and Domnall was Alexander's half brother. The Province or Kingdom of Moray was ruled by the family of Macbeth (Mac Bethad mac Findláich) and Lulach (Lulach mac Gille Coemgáin): not overmighty subjects, but a family who had ruled Alba within little more than a lifetime. Who the Mormaer or King was at this time is not known; it may have been Óengus of Moray or his father, whose name is not known. As for the Mearns, the only known Mormaer of Mearns, Máel Petair, had murdered Alexander's half-brother Duncan II (Donnchad mac Maíl Coluim) in 1094.

Alexander died in April 1124 at his court at Stirling; his brother David, probably the acknowledged heir since the death of Sybilla, succeeded him.

Fictional portrayals
Alexander was depicted in a fantasy novel, Pater Nostras Canis Dirus: The Garrison Effect (2010). Alexander is depicted as troubled by his lack of direct heirs, having no child with his wife Sybilla of Normandy. He points out that his father-in-law Henry I of England is asking them for a grandson.

References

Sources

Further reading
 
 Alexander I at the official website of the British monarchy

1070s births
1124 deaths
House of Dunkeld
12th-century Scottish monarchs
People from Dunfermline
Burials at Dunfermline Abbey
11th-century Scottish people
Gaelic monarchs in Scotland